The Jesus Valencia House is a historic house in San Juan, New Mexico. It was built in 1911 for Jesus Valencia. It was designed in the Vernacular New Mexico architectural style. It has been listed on the National Register of Historic Places since May 16, 1988.

It was listed on the National Register as part of a 1988 study of historic resources in the Mimbres Valley of Grant County.

References

Houses completed in 1911
Houses on the National Register of Historic Places in New Mexico
National Register of Historic Places in Grant County, New Mexico